The 2021 MTN 8 was the 47th edition of South Africa's annual soccer cup competition, the MTN 8. It featured the top eight teams of the Premier Soccer League at the end of the 2020–21 season.

Orlando Pirates were defending champions, but were eliminated by Swallows.

Teams
The eight teams competing in the MTN 8 knockout competition are (listed according to their finishing position in the 2020/2021 Premier Soccer League Season):

 Mamelodi Sundowns
 AmaZulu
 Orlando Pirates
 Golden Arrows
 SuperSport United
 Swallows
 Cape Town City
 Kaizer Chiefs

Quarter-finals

Semi-finals

Mamelodi Sundowns win 4–1 on aggregate.

Cape Town City win 4–0 on aggregate.

Final

References

MTN 8
2021–22 in South African soccer
2021 domestic association football cups